Make Do with What You Got is an album by R&B musician Solomon Burke. It was released on March 1, 2005, on the Shout! Factory and Sony BMG labels. The album was produced by Don Was and was nominated for a Grammy Award for Best Contemporary Blues Album.

Critical reception

Make Do with What You Got received mostly favorable reviews from music critics. AllMusic critic Mark Deming praised Burke's vocal ability while also criticizing Was's production.

Track listing

References

Solomon Burke albums
2005 albums
Shout! Factory albums
Sony BMG albums
Albums produced by Don Was
Covers albums